Events from the year 1625 in France

Incumbents
 Monarch – Louis XIII

Events
January – Battle of Blavet
September – Recovery of Ré island

Births

 20 August – Thomas Corneille, playwright (died 1709)

Full date missing
Joseph de Montclar, cavalry general (died 1690)
Gabriel Nicolas de la Reynie, police officer (died 1709)

Deaths
 
1 June – Honoré d'Urfé, novelist (born 1568)

Full date missing
Denis Jamet, priest
Nicolas Viel, Recollect missionary
Jacques Leschassier, jurist and magistrate (born 1550)
César Oudin, Hispanist, translator, grammarian and lexicographer (born c.1560)

See also

References

1620s in France